Club Deportivo Olimpia is a professional Honduran football club based in Tegucigalpa, Francisco Morazán.  The club is the nation's most successful team both in the domestic league and in international club competitions. Y

History
Olimpia was founded as a baseball club on June 12, 1912, by Héctor Pineda Ugarte, Carlos Bram, Arturo Bram, Enrique Buik, Santiago Buik, Miguel Sanchez, Samuel Inestrosa Gómez, and Ramón Field. In 1917, it also became a football team.

C.D. Olimpia is the most successful football team in Honduras, having won 31 domestic league titles since it was founded in 1912, the latest being the 2019–20 Apertura & Clausura season. It has also represented the Honduran football association in international club competitions more than any other team by far. They are the only Honduran club that has won the CONCACAF Champions Cup twice, first in 1972 and again in 1988. Olimpia is also the first team to win the Domestic Cup, known as "Copa Presidente," in 2015.

Amateur era
In 1957, C.D. Olimpia won the national championship of Honduras for the first time.  They repeated as champions in 1958 and 1959.  The national crown was not awarded in 1960, but they won it again in 1961, 1963, and 1964.  In 1964–65, the final season of the amateur era, Olimpia claimed a seventh championship, beating Escualo 2–0.

Players like "Furia" Solis, Rolin Castillo, Ricardo "Chendo" Rodriguez were stars during these seasons.

National League
The professional National League began in 1965, with Platense winning the first tournament. Olimpia was runner-up, finishing with 26 points to Platense's 27.  Things were different the following year, as Mario Griffin Cubas was appointed head coach.  In the 1966–67 season, he led Los Leones to 14 victories in 18 matches, winning the title six points clear of C.D. Marathón (29–23). Olimpia won the title again in 1967–68, again finishing two games clear of Marathón (27–22).

They relinquished the title to Motagua in 1968–69, but in 1969–70 stormed through the league undefeated, winning their third title in four years (43–35 ahead of Motagua).  After losing a championship playoff to Motagua in 1970–71, Los Leones regained the crown in 1971–72.  That championship was the product of the efforts of Rigoberto 'Chula' Gomez, Jorge Urquía, and Tonin Mendoza.

It would take 6 years for Olimpia to be crowned again.  That came in 1977, under the management of Carlos Cruz Carranza. That year, they faced Real España in a championship final.  The first match ended in a scoreless draw, but in the second match the old powers prevailed 2–0. Goals were scored by Uruguayan Walter Chávez and René Enamorado.

It was during the 1980s that Olimpia emerged as the dominant team in Honduras, winning five championships in ten years—1982, 1984, 1986, 1987, and 1989–90.  Three more championships came in the 1990s—1992–93, 1995–96, and 1996–97.  That 1996–97 championship was the final one before the short season was adopted.

Short tournament

Olimpia qualified for the playoffs in each of the first two seasons under the new format, but was eliminated each time.  They entered the 1998–99 season determined to overcome those defeats (although the 1998–99 season, played from January–May 1998, took on the format of an Apertura, it was officially known as season 1998–99). Olimpia topped the table in the regular season, then beat Platense and Victoria to reach the championship finals.  On July 17, Denilson Costa scored the only goal of a two-legged tie with Real Espana, bringing the title home to Olimpia once again.

Olimpia reached the finals of both Apertura 1999 and Clausura 2000, but on each occasion was defeated by Motagua on penalties.  In Apertura 2000, however, they were dominant, finishing 10 points clear of Motagua at the top of the regular season table.  Edwin Pavón was the manager, and the team was keyed by Danilo Tosello, Wilmer Velásquez and Alex Pineda Chacón. In the postseason, they reached the finals and played out a classic two-legged tie with Platense.  In the first leg, played at Platense's home stadium in Puerto Cortes, Olimpia came away with a vital 1–0 victory. Alex Pineda Chacón scored the winner in the 85th minute.  In the return leg, Rony Morales scored to even the tie for Platense, but Danilo Tosello's extra time penalty brought home another championship for Los Leones.

The Platense rivalry built, as Platense avenged the loss by beating Olimpia in Clausura 2001.  Olimpia answered by winning another title in Apertura 2002, and in thrilling style.  With the tie level 2–2 after 180 minutes of action, the championship drifted into extra time. Milton Palacios won the championship for Olimpia by rising above the crowd to head home the winning goal.

Clausura 2004 was the start of a new phase in the already fierce rivalry between Olimpia and C.D. Marathón, as the teams would meet in the finals four seasons in a row to determine the championship of Honduras. The first round went to Olimpia, which won the title 2–1 on aggregate.  Marathón came back to win Apertura 2004 in the same style, but Olimpia answered by winning Clausura 2005 3–2 on aggregate. Los Leones won it again in Apertura 2005, overcoming a 2–1 loss at Marathón to win the championship in extra time.

Clausura 2006 completed the most glorious run in Olimpia's history; they beat Victoria 4–3 on aggregate to complete their first threepeat (three wins).

Other titles followed in Clausura 2008 (beating the old rivals Marathón), Clausura 2009 (in extra time over Real Espana), and Clausura 2010 (over Motagua).  However, the next era of glory began in Apertura 2011. That was the season that Danilo Tosello, who had played for Olimpia from 1999 to 2007, returned as manager.  In Tosello's first season as manager, he led them to a convincing 3–0 aggregate victory over Real Espana in the championship round. They repeated as champions in Clausura 2012, beating Marathón 1–0 on aggregate. Then, finally, in Apertura 2012, still under Tosello's guidance, Olimpia defeated Victoria 4–0 to complete a second .

Tosello stepped down after the season, but Olimpia's run of dominance continued. They won a fourth consecutive championship in Clausura 2013; after losing 1–0 to Real Sociedad in the first leg, they won 2–0 at home to claim the crown.

Olimpia's quest for an unprecedented fifth straight crown ended in Apertura 2013, but they did beat Marathón 4–2 on penalties in Clausura 2014 to hoist a fifth title in six years. They also beat Motagua to win Clausura 2015, and Real Sociedad to win Clausura 2016.

International success

In 1973, Olimpia won their first CONCACAF Champions' Cup by defeating SV Robinhood of Suriname in San Pedro Sula by a score of 1–0 after tying the first leg at zero in Tegucigalpa. Before reaching the final, Olimpia managed to eliminate Mexico's Club Toluca. The club won their second CONCACAF Champions' Cup in 1988 when they defeated Defence Force in the final match of the tournament.  Before that, Olimpia managed to defeat and eliminate Mexican champions Cruz Azul by a score of 2–1 in a historic match that took place in the Estadio Azteca. To this day, Olimpia remains the only Central American club to have defeated a Mexican team in that stadium. In the semi-finals, Olimpia defeated LD Alajuelense in the Estadio Alejandro Morera Soto after they tied the home game in Tegucigalpa.

In January 2001, Olimpia beat the Mexican teams of Toluca and Pachuca. The team, managed by Edwin Pavón triumphed over Toluca with a goal from Robert Lima, 3 goals from Denilson Costa, and one from Alex Pineda Chacon. The lineup for that match was: Donaldo González, Gerson Vásquez, Robert Lima, Samuel Caballero, Nerlin Membreño, Christian Santamaría, Arnold Cruz, Danilo Tosello, José Luis Pineda, Alex Pineda, Denilson Costa, Carlos Paez, and Elmer Marín.

In 2017, Olimpia earned the inaugural Scotiabank CONCACAF League title. Olimpia, which lifted its first CONCACAF trophy since the 1988. The Honduran power, however, captured the inaugural SCL title Thursday, overcoming host Santos de Guapiles 4–1 on penalty kicks at Nacional stadium of Costa Rica, after their two-legged final ended 1–1 on aggregate. Both sides won 1–0 on the road.

Michaell Chirinos’ goal in the 21st minute at the Estadio Nacional was the lifeline Olimpia needed in order to lift its first CONCACAF trophy since the 1988 CONCACAF Champions’ Cup. As a result, Olimpia maintained its record of being the only team to compete in the first 10 SCCL editions. They did not qualify for the 2019 SCCL.

Logos
For the 2005–06 tournament, the team modified its logo. It is similar to the previous one, it now has 4 stars in the red side. Each star is said to represent 5 Championships. In 2012, the Honduran club Olimpia celebrates 100 years of life. To celebrate the centenary launched a redesigned shield, same as according to the institution symbolizes the winning attitude of its history.

Sponsorship
 Official shirt sponsors - Banco Atlantida (Banco Atlantida), Coca-Cola, Hugo , Salvavida, Salvavida
 Official shirt manufacturer – Umbro
 Official Beer – Salvavida

Supporters
Olimpia has a strong fan base throughout Honduras, even in cities that have a team in the Honduran first division. As a result, it is the most popular team in the country.

The club's barra brava is La Ultra Fiel. La Ultra Fiel particularly has a fierce rivalry with neighboring club Motagua and their barra brava known as "Los Revolucionarios" or short "La Revo".

Club rivalries

Clásico Nacional

El Clásico Nacional (The National Classic) is a Honduran National derby played between Olimpia and Marathón. The derby receives the "national" adjective more because of a geographic matter (Olimpia is from Tegucigalpa and Marathón is from San Pedro Sula, the biggest cities of the country) than for a football or rivalry matter. Olimpia won its first national title in September 1928. At that time Olimpia (representing the central zone of the country) won a final series of three matches against Marathón, champion of the northern league. Following this result, a big rivalry began between these two teams.

The Clasico Capitalino (Capital's Classic) is played between Olimpia and Motagua Their matches are also known as the Clasico Local (Local Classic). There is a huge rivalry between the clubs and their fans; (La Ultra Fiel (of Olimpia) and La Revo (of Motagua). Some people claim that this is the real National Derby because Olimpia and Motagua are the first and second Honduran teams with more titles. Additionally, matches between Olimpia and Marathón do not generate the same expectations and polemics as matches between Olimpia and Motagua do.

Clásico Moderno (Honduras)

El Clásico Moderno (The Modern Derby) also referred by some as the Clasico Moderno Hondureño is a Honduran football match played at least 4 times a year in the Honduran Liga Nacional and consists of two teams, Olimpia and Real España.

Reserve team
Olimpia has a reserve team named Olimpia Reservas that currently plays in Liga de Ascenso de Honduras. This is where young players can improve their skills before they can be ready to play in the top division. Like all the other reserves teams in Liga de Ascenso, Olimpia Reservas can't be promoted to the higher level even if they win the championship.

Honours
Domestic
Liga Nacional de Fútbol de Honduras: 34
1966–67, 1967–68, 1969–70, 1971–72, 1977–78, 1982–83, 1984–85, 1986–87, 1987–88, 1989–90, 1992–93, 1995–96, 1996–97, 1998–99, Apertura 2000, Apertura 2002, Clausura 2004, Clausura 2005, Apertura 2005, Clausura 2006, Clausura 2008, Clausura 2009, Clausura 2010, Apertura 2011, Clausura 2012, Apertura 2012, Clausura 2013, Clausura 2014, Clausura 2015, Clausura 2016, Apertura 2019,  Apertura 2020, Clausura 2020, Apertura 2021
Runners-up (17): 1965–66, 1968–69, 1970–71, 1975–76, 1988–89, 1994–95, Clausura 1998, Apertura 1999, Clausura 2000, Clausura 2001, Clausura 2002, Apertura 2003, Apertura 2004, Apertura 2006, Apertura 2009, Apertura 2010, Clausura 2011,

Super Copa: 1
1996–97

President's Cup: 3
1995, 1998, 2015

International
CONCACAF Champions' Cup: 2
1972, 1988
Runners-up (2): 1985, 2000

CONCACAF League: 2
2017, 2022

Copa Fraternidad / UNCAF Interclub Cup: 2
1999, 2000
Runners-up (3): 1981, 2005, 2006

Copa Interamericana: 0
Runners-up (2): 1972, 1988

Individual club achievements
Seven Consecutive Honduran finals
First Central American Team to be classified to FIFA Club World Championship
Only Central American team to play in Estadio Centenario in Uruguay
Only Honduran team that has defeated  Boca Juniors 2-1
Only Honduran team to play in the Estadio Libertadores de America in Argentina
Only Central American team to play in the Rose Bowl

International competition
 CONCACAF Champions' Cup
 UNCAF Interclub Cup
 CONCACAF Champions League

CONCACAF Champions' Cup
1962 CONCACAF Champions' Cup
First Round v.  LD Alajuelense – 0:1, 1:1 (Alajuelense advanced 2:1 on aggregate)

1967 CONCACAF Champions' Cup
First Round v.  Aurora F.C. – 1:0, 0:1, 0–2 (Aurora advanced 2:0 on replay)

1968 CONCACAF Champions' Cup
First Round v.  Alianza – 2:1, 1:0 (Olimpia advanced 3:1 on aggregate)
Second Round v.  Aurora F.C. – 1:1, 0:4 (Aurora advanced 5:1 on aggregate)

1970 CONCACAF Champions' Cup
First Round v.  CSD Municipal – 3:2, 0:0 (Olimpia advanced 3:2 on aggregate)
Final Round v.  Deportivo Saprissa – 1:4

1971 CONCACAF Champions' Cup
First Round v.  LD Alajuelense – 0:0, 0:1 (Alajuelense advanced 1:0 on aggregate)

1972 CONCACAF Champions' Cup
Semi-finals v.  Club Toluca – 1:0, 1:1 (Olimpia advanced 2:1 on aggregate)
Final v.  SV Robinhood – 0:0, 2:0 (Olimpia won 2:0 on aggregate)

1973 CONCACAF Champions' Cup
First Round v.  CSD Municipal – 0:0, 0:1 (Municipal advanced 1:0 on aggregate)

1976 CONCACAF Champions' Cup
First Round v.  Real España – 0:0, 1:0 (Olimpia advance 1:0 on aggregate)
Second Round v.  Diriangén – (Olimpia withdrew)

1983 CONCACAF Champions' Cup
First Round v.  UANL – 0:1, 1:2 (UANL advanced 3:1 on aggregate)

1985 CONCACAF Champions' Cup
First Round v.  Chicago Croatian – 4:0, 2:0 (Olimpia advanced 6:0 on aggregate)
Second Round v.  CD Suchitepéquez – 1:0, 0:1 (Olimpia advanced 4:3 on penalties)
Third Round v.  Club América – 2:2, 1:0 (Olimpia advanced 3:2 on aggregate)
Fourth Round v.  Aurora F.C. – 0:1, 2:0 (Olimpia advanced 2:1 on aggregate)
Final v.  Defence Force – 0:2, 1:0 (Defence Force won 2:1 on aggregate)

1987 CONCACAF Champions' Cup
First Round v.  Coke Milpross – 8:1, 1:1 (Olimpia advanced 9:1 on aggregate)
Second Round v.  Galcasa – 1:0
Second Round v.  CS Herediano – 0:0
Second Round v.  Águila – 2:1
Third Round v.  Deportivo Saprissa – 4:1
Third Round v.  Real España – 1:0
Third Round v.  CS Herediano – 1:2
Semi-finals v.  CF Monterrey – 0:1, 2:2 (Monterrey advanced 3:2 on aggregate)

1988 CONCACAF Champions' Cup
Group D v.  FAS – 3:1
Group D v.  Aurora F.C. – 1:1
Group D v.  Puntarenas – 2:0
Third Round v.  Aurora F.C. – 0:0
Third Round v.  LD Alajuelense – 1:1
Third Round v.  C.D. Marathón – 2:1
Fourth Round v.  Cruz Azul – 0:0, 4:1 (Olimpia advanced 4:1 on aggregate)
Semi-finals v.  LD Alajuelense – 1:1, 1:0 (Olimpia advanced 2:1 on aggregate)
Final v.  Defence Force – 2:0, 2:0 (Olimpia won 4:0 on aggregate)

1989 CONCACAF Champions' Cup
First Round v.  Cojutepeque – 3:1
First Round v.  CS Herediano – 2:1
First Round v.  CSD Municipal – 2:2
Second Round v.  CS Cartaginés – 3:0
Second Round v.  Real España – 3:0
Second Round v.  CS Herediano – 1:1
Third Round v.  Pumas UNAM – 1:1, 0:5 (UNAM advanced 6:1 on aggregate)

1990 CONCACAF Champions' Cup
First Round v.  Juventus – 2:0, 2:0 (Olimpia advance 4:0 on aggregate)
Second Round v.  CD Suchitepéquez – 2:2, 2:0 (Olimpia advance 4:2 on aggregate)
Third Round v.  Firpo – 1:1
Third Round v.  Firpo – 1:0
Third Round v.  Real España – 1:4
Third Round v.  Real España – 1:0
Semi-finals v.  Club América – 3:0, 1:2 (América advanced 4:2 on aggregate)

1994 CONCACAF Champions' Cup
First Round v.  CS Herediano – 0:0, 0:2 (Herediano advance 2:0 on aggregate)

1996 CONCACAF Champions' Cup
First Round v.  Deportivo Saprissa – 0:4, 3:0 (Saprissa advance 4:3 on aggregate)

1997 CONCACAF Champions' Cup
First Round v.  Firpo – 0:0, 4:1 (Firpo advance 4:1 on aggregate)

1998 CONCACAF Champions' Cup
First Round v.  Juventus – 2:0
First Round v.  CSD Comunicaciones – 3:2
First Round v.  Alianza – 4:1
Second Round v.  LD Alajuelense – 0:1
Second Round v.  C.D. Luis Ángel Firpo – 0:2
Second Round v.  LD Alajuelense – 1:5
Second Round v.  C.D. Luis Ángel Firpo – 1:1

1999 CONCACAF Champions' Cup
Quarter-Finals v.  DC United – 0:1

2000 CONCACAF Champions' Cup
Quarter-Finals v.  Club Toluca – 1:0
Semi-finals v.  Pachuca – 4:0
Final v.  Los Angeles Galaxy – 2:3

2002 CONCACAF Champions' Cup
First Round v.  San Jose Earthquakes – 0:1, 1:3 (San Jose Earthquakes advance 4:1 on aggregate)

2005 CONCACAF Champions' Cup
Quarter-Finals v.  Pumas UNAM – 1:1, 1:2 (UNAM advance 3:2 on aggregate)

2006 CONCACAF Champions' Cup
Quarter-Finals v.  Club Toluca – 0:2, 1:2 (Toluca advance 4:1 on aggregate)

2007 CONCACAF Champions' Cup
Quarter-Finals v.  DC United – 1:4, 2:3 (DC United advance 7:3 on aggregate)

2008-09 CONCACAF Champions League
Group C v.  Atlante – 0:1
Group C v.  Joe Public – 3:1
Group C v.  Montreal Impact – 1:2
Group C v.  Atlante – 1:1
Group C v.  Montreal Impact – 1:1
Group C v.  Joe Public – 4:0

UNCAF Interclub Cup
1999 UNCAF Interclub Cup
First Round v.  FAS – 1:0
First Round v.  Aurora F.C. – 0:0
First Round v.  LD Alajuelense – 1:1
First Round v.  Acros Real Verdes – 2:0
First Round v.  FAS – 2:1
First Round v.  Aurora F.C. – 2:2
First Round v.  LD Alajuelense – 4:1
First Round v.  Acros Real Verdes – 1:0
Final Round v.  LD Alajuelense – 2:0
Final Round v.  CSD Comunicaciones – 3:1
Final Round v.  Deportivo Saprissa – 1:0

2000 UNCAF Interclub Cup
First Round v.  La Victoria F.C. – 3:0
First Round v.  CSD Municipal – 2:3
Second Round v.  Panama Viejo – 5:0
Second Round v.  CSD Municipal – 0:0
Second Round v.  Deportivo Saprissa – 1:4
Final Round v.  CSD Municipal – 0:0
Final Round v.  Real España – 2:0
Final Round v.  LD Alajuelense – 0:0

2001 UNCAF Interclub Cup
First Round v.  CSD Municipal – 0:0
First Round v.  LD Alajuelense – 0:0
First Round v.  Plaza Amador – 6:0
Final Round v.  CSD Comunicaciones – 2:0
Final Round v.  Deportivo Saprissa – 1:3
Final Round v.  CSD Municipal – 1:2

2003 UNCAF Interclub Cup
First Round v.  LD Alajuelense – 1:2
First Round v.  CD Marathón – 0:0
First Round v.  San Francisco FC – 0:1

2004 UNCAF Interclub Cup
First Round v.  Boca Juniors – 1:0, 5:0 (Olimpia advanced 6:0 on aggregate)
Quarter-Finals v.  CS Herediano – 3:2, 0:1 (Olimpia advanced on away goals rule)
Final Round v.  Deportivo Saprissa – 0:0
Final Round v.  CSD Municipal – 1:0
Final Round v.  FAS – 1:3

2005 UNCAF Interclub Cup
First Round v.  Diriangén FC – 0:3, 1:2 (Olimpia advanced 4:2 on aggregate)
Quarter-Finals v.  CD Suchitepéquez – 4:1, 4:0 (Olimpia advanced 8:1 on aggregate)
Semi-finals v.  Deportivo Saprissa – 3:1, 1:1 (Olimpia advanced 4:2 on aggregate)
Final v.  LD Alajuelense – 0:1, 1:0 (Alajuelense won 4:2 on penalties)

2006 UNCAF Interclub Cup
First Round v.  Diriangén FC – 0:3, 2:1 (Olimpia advanced 5:1 on aggregate)
Quarter-Finals v.  CSD Municipal – 1:1, 3:0 (Olimpia advanced 4:1 on aggregate)
Semi-finals v.  Victoria – 2:2, 2:0 (Olimpia advanced 4:2 on aggregate)
Final v.  Puntarenas – 2:3, 1:0 (Puntarenas won 3:1 on penalties)

2007 UNCAF Interclub Cup
First Round v.  San Francisco – 0:0, 0:1 (San Francisco advanced 1:0 on aggregate)

Personnel

Technical staff

Board of directors

Current squad

Out on loan

Retired numbers

Club records

Top goalscorers
As of 11 March 2021.
Players in bold are still present in club.

  Wilmer "Matador" Velásquez (392 matches/196 goals)
  Denilson Costa (262 matches/99 goals)
  Danilo "Francotirador" Tosello (298 matches/86 goals)
  Prudencio "Tecate" Norales (189 matches/76 goals)
  Roger Rojas (122 matches/70 goals)
  Rigoberto "Shula" Gomez (63)
  Juan "Matador" Flores (57)
  Alex Pineda Chacón (129 matches/52 goals)
  Jorge González (144 matches/46 goals)
  Luciano Emilio (64 matches/42 goals)
  Jorge "Indio" Urquía (40)
  Ramiro Bruschi (38)
  Reynaldo Mejía (38 goals)
  Jorge Brand (36)
  Christian Santamaría (34)
  Marlon Hernández (32)
  Wilson Palacios (102 matches/32 goals)
  Carlos Laje Moreno (32)
  Juan Manuel Cárcamo (196 matches/32 goals)
  Reynaldo Tilguath (184 matches/32 goals)
  Nahúm Espinoza (31)

List of coaches

 Jose Matera
 Jaime Ramírez Banda
 Gerck Block (1992-1993)
 Juan Andino (1965)
 Mario Griffin (1966–68)
 Carlos Suazo (1969)
 Chelato Uclés (1970–71)
 Carlos Viera (1971)
 Claudio Ramírez Banda (1975)
 Carlos Cruz Carranza (1977)
 Luis Cubilla (1979–80)
 José Luis Mattera Teglia (1982)
 Enrique Grey (1984)
 Néstor Matamala (1986)
 Carlos Padilla (1987)
 Estanislao Malinowski (1988–89)
 Luis Cubilla (1988–93)
 Chelato Uclés (1992–94)
 Estanislao Malinowski (1994)
 Flavio Ortega (1995-1997)
 Luis Cubilla (1995–02)
 Chelato Uclés (1996–98)
 Gilberto Yearwood (1997–98)
 Francisco Sá (1998)
 Julio González (1999), (2000)
 Ernesto Omar Luzardo
 Edwin Pavón (A. 2000–01)
 Juan Carlos Espinoza (A. 2002–03)
 Chelato Uclés (C. 2003–04)
 Alejandro Dominguez (2004)
 Nahúm Espinoza (2004–06)
 Juan de Dios Castillo (C. 2007–08)
 Juan Carlos Espinoza (A. 2008–09)
 Carlos Restrepo (C. Jan 2010 – March 11)
 Juan Carlos Espinoza (March 11 – June 11)
 Danilo Tosello (A. July 2011–1?)
 Oscar Salgado (2013)
 Héctor Vargas (2013–2017)
 Carlos Restrepo ( – Mar 2018)
 Nahúm Espinoza (Mar 2018 – Oct 2018)	
 Manuel Keosseián (Oct 2018– Jun 2019)
 Pedro Troglio (Jul 2019–Dec 2021)
 Pablo Lavallén (Jan 2021–)

References

External links

 Official website

 
Football clubs in Honduras
Football clubs in Tegucigalpa
Association football clubs established in 1912
1912 establishments in Honduras
O
O
O